The men's 4×200 metre freestyle relay event at the 1956 Summer Olympic Games took place 1 – 3 December The relay featured teams of four swimmers each swimming four lengths of the 50 m pool freestyle.

Medalists

Results

Heats

Two heats were held; the teams with the eight fastest times advanced to the Finals.  The teams that advanced are highlighted.

Heat 1

Heat 2

Final

References

Swimming at the 1956 Summer Olympics
4 × 200 metre freestyle relay
Men's events at the 1956 Summer Olympics